Kızıllar may refer to the following places in Turkey:

 Kızıllar, Çavdır
 Kızıllar, Kozan
 Kızıllar, Ulus